Dowlatabad in Qom Province may refer to:

Dowlatabad-e Aqa
Dowlatabad (34°42′ N 50°27′ E), Jafarabad
Dowlatabad (34°49′ N 50°35′ E), Jafarabad
Dowlatabad, Salafchegan